Gagneux is a French surname. Notable people with the surname include:

Georgette Gagneux (1907–1931), French Olympic sprint runner
Renaud Gagneux (born 1947), French composer

See also
Gagneur

French-language surnames